Borislav Ochushki (born 18 April 1934) is a Bulgarian cross-country skier. He competed in the men's 15 kilometre event at the 1964 Winter Olympics.

References

External links
 

1934 births
Living people
Bulgarian male cross-country skiers
Olympic cross-country skiers of Bulgaria
Cross-country skiers at the 1964 Winter Olympics
Place of birth missing (living people)